The Our Lady of the Assumption Cathedral Also Tlaxcala de Xicohténcatl Cathedral Is the main Catholic church in the city of Tlaxcala, Mexico. It was first known as the Temple of St. Francis of Assisi (Templo de San Francisco de Asís), however, when the Diocese began to rise, it was decided to name the cathedral and as it is commonly known; Dedicated as a cathedral under the invocation of Our Lady of the Assumption during the erection of the diocese of Tlaxcala.

Built in the sixteenth century between 1530 and 1536 according to Diego Muñoz Camargo, the temple is a single nave, with wooden roofing, and the deck is of viguería, adorned by a magnificent paneled wooden Mudejar style, Very well preserved and in fact one of the last of its kind that still remain in the American continent. The dome of the temple is octagonal and with a convent as part of its grounds.

In 2021, at the 44th session of the World Heritage Committee, the Cathedral was added as the fifteenth location of the "Monasteries on the slopes of Popocatépetl" UNESCO World Heritage Site.

See also

Roman Catholicism in Mexico
Our Lady of the Assumption

References

Roman Catholic cathedrals in Mexico
Roman Catholic churches completed in 1540
16th-century Roman Catholic church buildings in Mexico